St Eunan's Cathedral may refer to:

 The Roman Catholic Cathedral of St Eunan and St Columba in Letterkenny, County Donegal, Ireland.
 The Anglican St Eunan's Cathedral, Raphoe in Donegal

See also
 Saint Eunan (disambiguation)